Bonjour la Classe is a British television comedy series which was broadcast on BBC1 in the beginning of 1993. Created and written by Paul Smith and Terry Kyan, the series centred on Laurence Didcott, a new teacher of French at the fictional prestigious Mansion School.

Didcott discovers a prevailing attitude at Mansion, among staff, benefactors and even students and parents that places what is best for the school (e.g. fundraising, school image) ahead of the education of the pupils and their wellbeing. The scenes at the school were shot in the winter of 1992.

Cast
Nigel Planer – Laurence Didcott
Polly Adams – Jean Halifax
Timothy Bateson – Leonard Wigley
Victoria Carling – Harriet Humphrey
Robert Gillespie – Gilbert Herring
David Troughton – Eric Sweety
Nicholas Woodeson – Leslie Piper
Peter Woodthorpe – Donald Halifax
Rebecca Callard – Lucy Cornwell
Bryan Dick – Adam Hunley
David Larkin – Clive Crotty
Daniel Newman – Hugo Botney
Simeon Pearl – Anthony Zalacosta
Camilla Power – Pamela Slotover

External links

1993 British television series debuts
1993 British television series endings
1990s British sitcoms
1990s British workplace comedy television series
BBC television sitcoms
British high school television series
English-language television shows
Television series about educators
Television series by Fremantle (company)
Television shows set in Hertfordshire